Tata Consultancy Services (TCS) is an Indian multinational information technology (IT) services and consulting company with its headquarters in Mumbai. It is a part of the Tata Group and operates in 150 locations across 46 countries. In July 2022, it was reported that TCS had over 600,000 employees worldwide.

TCS is the second largest Indian company by market capitalization and is among the most valuable IT service brands worldwide.  In 2015, TCS was ranked 64th overall in the Forbes "World's Most Innovative Companies" ranking, making it one of the highest-ranked IT services companies and a top Indian company. As of 2018, it is ranked eleventh on the Fortune India 500 list. In September 2021, TCS recorded a market capitalization of US$200 billion, making it the first Indian IT tech company to do so. In December 2022, the market cap was Rs. 11,71,481.89 crore.

In 20162017, parent company Tata Sons owned 72.05% of TCS and more than 70% of Tata Sons' dividends were generated by TCS.

History

1968–2005 
Tata Consultancy Services Limited, initially started as Tata Computer Systems, was founded in 1968 by a division of Tata Sons Limited. Its early contracts included punched card services to sister company TISCO (now Tata Steel), working on an Inter-Branch Reconciliation System for the Central Bank of India, and providing bureau services to Unit Trust of India.

In 1975, TCS delivered an electronic depository and trading system called SECOM for a Swiss company SIS SegaInterSettle; it also developed System X for the Canadian Depository System and automated the Johannesburg Stock Exchange. TCS associated with a Swiss partner, TKS Teknosoft, which it later acquired.

In 1980, TCS established India's first dedicated software research and development centre, the Tata Research Development and Design Centre (TRDDC) in Pune. In 1981, it established India's first client-dedicated offshore development centre, set up for clients Tandem. In 1993 TCS partnered with Canada-based software factory Integrity Software Corp, which TCS later acquired.

In anticipation of the Y2K bug and the launch of a unified European currency (Euro), Tata Consultancy Services created the factory model for Y2K conversion and developed software tools which automated the conversion process and enabled third-party developer and client implementation. Towards the end of 1999, TCS decided to offer Decision Support System (DSS) in the domestic market under its Corporate Vice President and Transformation Head Subbu Iyer. The company also registered its first tagline “Beyond the Obvious” in 1999.

2005 to 2021 
On 25 August 2004, TCS became a publicly listed company.

In 2005, TCS became the first India based IT services company to enter the bioinformatics market, and in the same year TCS changed the tagline from “Beyond the Obvious” to "Experience Certainty". In 2006, it designed an ERP system for the Indian Railway Catering and Tourism Corporation. By 2008, its e-business activities were generating over US$500 million in annual revenues.

TCS entered the small and medium enterprises market for the first time in 2011, with cloud-based offerings. On the last trading day of 2011, it overtook RIL to achieve the highest market capitalization of any India-based company. In the 2011–12 fiscal year, TCS achieved annual revenues of over US$10 billion for the first time.

In 2013, the firm moved from the 13th position to 10th position in the League of top 10 global IT services companies and in July 2014, it became the first Indian company with over  market capitalization.

In Jan 2015, TCS ends RIL's 23-year run as India's most profitable firm.

In Jan 2017, the company announced a partnership with Aurus, Inc., a payments technology company, to deliver payment solutions for retailers using TCS OmniStore, a first of its kind unified store commerce platform. In the same year, TCS China was associated as a joint venture with the Chinese government.

In March 2018, Tata Sons sold stocks of TCS worth $1.25 billion in a bulk deal.

TCS received the 2019 American Business Awards from Four Stevies.

On 8 October 2020, TCS surpassed Accenture in market capitalization to become the world's most-valuable IT company with a market cap of $144.73 billion. On 25 January 2021, TCS again surpassed Accenture briefly, in market capitalization to become the world's most-valuable IT company with a market cap of $170 billion. In 2021 Tata is also one of the largest job provider in India hiring 43,000 individuals in H1 FY22. In October 2021, N Ganapathy Subramaniam, the COO of TCS, stated that its platforms and products business is worth approximately $3 billion. The company's platforms and products business includes TCS' SaaS-based platforms, and according to Subramaniam, between October 2020 and October 2021, 95% of the deals won by TCS have been for its cloud platforms and SaaS platforms. Also, in 2021 TCS got a millennial makeover. Under the leadership of Rajashree R, TCS Chief Marketing Officer (CMO), the company changed the tagline from "Experience Certainty" to "Building on Belief".

In May 2021, alongside consortium partner Neurotechnology, TCS was selected by the Unique Identification Authority of India (UIDAI) to provide biometric technology for the Aadhaar digital ID program. The Aadhaar program has been described by the World Bank Chief Economist Paul Romer as the "most sophisticated ID programme in the world" owing to the existing database of over 1.3 billion citizens.

Acquisitions

Operations
As of March 2021, TCS had a total of 50 subsidiary companies and operated in 46 countries.

Locations
TCS has operations in the following locations:

India:

Ahmedabad, Bengaluru, Baroda, Bhubaneswar, Chennai, Coimbatore,  Delhi, Gandhinagar, Goa, Gurugram, Guwahati, Hyderabad, Bhopal, Indore, Jamshedpur, Kalyan, Thane, Kochi, Kolkata, Lucknow, New Delhi, Mumbai, Nagpur, Noida, Nashik, Patna, Pune, Thiruvananthapuram, and Varanasi.

Asia (excluding India):

Bahrain, China, Israel, UAE, Hong Kong, Indonesia, Japan, Malaysia, the Philippines, Saudi Arabia, Singapore, South Korea, Taiwan, Thailand, and Qatar.

Oceania:

Australia

Africa:

South Africa, Morocco (closed)

Europe:

Belgium, Bulgaria, Denmark, Finland, France, Germany, Hungary, Iceland, Republic of Ireland, Italy, Luxembourg, the Netherlands, Norway, Portugal, Spain, Sweden, Switzerland, and the United Kingdom.

North America:

Canada, Mexico, and the United States.

South America:

Argentina, Brazil, Chile, Colombia, Ecuador, Peru, and Uruguay.

TCS BPS
TCS BPS (Business Process Services) is the third-largest India-based IT outsourcing company (after Capgemini). The BPS division had revenues of US$1.44 billion in FY 201213, which was 12.5% of the total revenue of TCS. TCS BPS has more than 45,000 employees who serve over 225 million customers across 11 countries. The rate of attrition in the BPS division during the financial year 201213 was 19.5%. The firm has also opened a business process outsourcing facility in the Philippines.

Life Sciences and Healthcare
Since 2006 TCS signed multi million contracts from american biopharma giants Pfizer, Eli Lilly etc for providing clinical research-data management, biostatistics, and medical writing services. TCS also provides services to european biopharma giants such as Roche, Novartis etc in the areas of clinical data management, biostatistics, clinical programming, pharmacovigilance, and RWE support towards global drug development efforts.

Tata Research Development and Design Centre

TCS established India's first software research centre, the Tata Research Development and Design Centre, in Pune, in 1981. TRDDC undertakes research in software engineering, process engineering, bioinformatics, and systems research. Researchers at TRDDC also developed MasterCraft (now a suite of digitization and optimization tools), a Model-driven Development software that can automatically create codes based on a model of a software, and rewrite the codes based on the users' needs. The research at TRDDC has also resulted in the development of Sujal, a low-cost water purifier, that can be manufactured using locally available resources. TCS deployed thousands of these filters in the Indian Ocean tsunami disaster of 2004 as part of its relief activities. This product has been marketed in India as Tata Swach, a low-cost water purifier.

Innovation labs
In 2007, TCS launched its co-innovation network, a network of innovation labs, start-up alliances, university research departments, and venture capitalists. In addition, TCS has 19 innovation labs based in three countries. TCS' partners include Collabnet and Cassatt, and academic institutions such as IITs, Stanford, MIT, and Carnegie Mellon, and venture capitalists like Sequoia and Kleiner Perkins.

Employees
TCS is one of the largest private-sector employers in India, and the fourth-largest employer among listed Indian companies (after Indian Railways, Indian Army, and India Post). TCS has crossed more than 600,000 employees as of 8 July 2022. The number of non-Indian nationals was 21,282 as of 31 March 2013 (7.7%).  The employee costs for the FY 201213 were US$4.38 billion, which was approx. 38% of the total revenue of the company for that period. In the fiscal year 201213, TCS recruited a total of 69,728 new staff, of whom 59,276 were based in India and 10,452 were based in the rest of the world. In the same period, the rate of attrition was 10.6%. The average age of a TCS employee is 28 years.  The employee utilization rate, excluding trainees, for the FY 201213 was 82%.
TCS was the fifth-largest United States visa recipient in 2008 (after Infosys, CTS, Wipro, and Mahindra Satyam). In 2012, the Tata Group companies, including TCS, were the second-largest recipient of H-1B visas. As of Jan 2020, TCS has over 400,000+ employees. It is the world's third-largest IT employer behind IBM and HP.

Subramaniam Ramadorai, the former CEO of TCS, has authored an autobiographical book about his experiences in the company called The TCS Story...and Beyond.

Former CEOs of TCS
F. C. Kohli, co-founder and first CEO and MD of TCS from 1968 to 1996, known as "Father of Indian IT Industry"
Subramaniam Ramadorai, CEO and MD of TCS from 1996 to 2009, and Vice - Chairman till 6 October 2014
Natarajan Chandrasekaran, COO, Executive Director, and CEO of TCS from 2009 to 2017
Rajesh Gopinathan,CEO and MD of TCS from 2017 to 2023

Sponsorships
TCS is the title sponsor for Toronto Waterfront Marathon, London Marathon, Amsterdam Marathon, Mumbai Marathon, Lidingöloppet, and New York City Marathon and one of the sponsors of City2Surf, Australian Running Festival, Berlin Marathon, Chicago Marathon, and Boston Marathon. In India, it is the title sponsor of World 10K held in Bangalore every year. TCS is a sponsor of the Indian Premier League team Rajasthan Royals since 2009. Besides, TCS provides Rajasthan Royals with technology to help in the analysis of player performance, simulation, and use of RFID tags for tracking the players’ fitness levels and for security purposes in the stadiums. TCS sponsors an annual IT quiz for high school students called TCS IT Wiz. The TCS IT Wiz is the largest quiz in India, attracting students who are studying between class 8 and class 12. This quiz is hosted by Giri Balasubramanium.

TCS also currently sponsors Jaguar Racing in Formula E and Nakajima Racing in Super Formula.

Controversies
On 14 February 2006, US law firm Lieff Cabraser filed a nationwide class action lawsuit against Tata. In July 2013, judge Claudia Wilken of the US District Court, Northern District of California in Oakland, California, granted final approval to the settlement of the lawsuit on behalf of all non-US citizens employed by TCS within the state of California from 14 February 2002 to 30 June 2005. The workers claimed that they were forced to sign over their federal and state tax refunds to their employer, as well as stating their Indian salaries were wrongfully deducted from their US pay.

A US grand jury has slapped two companies of India's Tata GroupTata Consultancy Services and Tata America International Corpwith a US$940 million fine in a trade secret lawsuit filed against them. Epic Systems had accused TCS and Tata America International Corp, in a lawsuit filed in October 2014 in US District Court in Madison, which was amended in January and December 2015, of "brazenly stealing the trade secrets, confidential information, documents and data" belonging to Epic.  This Epic Systems lawsuit against TCS was closed and settled with an undisclosed out-of-court agreement that was completed in January 2018.

A federal class-action lawsuit accusing Tata Consultancy Services Ltd. of bias against US-born workers was heard by the court during a jury trial in November 2018.  The US federal court Case in Northern District of California (Buchanan v. Tata Consultancy Servs., Ltd., 4:15-cv-01696) is one of seven asserting that several large offshore and national IT staffing companies with operations in the US prefer foreign workers from South Asia over qualified Americans. All the companies being sued are heavy users of H-1B guestworker visas, which go to skilled professionals in "specialty occupations".  The US Federal District Court Case 15-cv-01696-YGR consolidated these lawsuits against TCS and several other IT staffing companies into a class action trial and was allowed by the Federal District Court to proceed (but not yet certified) with a November 2018 jury trial.

In May 2013, the Canadian Broadcasting Corporation (CBC), in its extensive coverage of the hiring of temporary foreign workers in Canada and the unemployment issues faced by Canadians, reported that TCS rarely hires skilled experienced Canadians at the Toronto offices while advertising open positions in Canada. TCS responded that the company hired more than 125 Canadian workers in 2013 who make less than 1.2% of the 10,452 workers the company has outside of India.

In April 2015, a class-action lawsuit against TCS was filed in a San Francisco federal court by a US information technology worker and ex-employee, who accused the company of discriminating against American workers by favouring South Asians in hiring and promotion. The lawsuit claimed that South Asians comprise 95% of the company's 14,000-person US workforce and that TCS engaged in discriminatory practices by sourcing most of its workforce through the H-1B visa programme, by focusing its US-based hiring disproportionately on South Asians, and by favouring South Asian employees in its human resources practices. In response, TCS refuted the plaintiff's claims, assuring that it is an equal opportunity employer and bases its employment practices on non-discriminatory reasons. A spokesperson said that in 2014 alone the company had recruited over 2,600 US hires.

That same month, electric utility Southern California Edison (SCE) laid off about 400 IT employees, with an additional 100 IT workers leaving voluntarily. Meanwhile, the utility company hired  immigrants from TCS and competing company Infosys. In October 2015, the United States Department of Labor concluded Infosys did not abuse the H1-B programme in the dealings with SCE, while TCS's case remained open.

See also
  
 List of IT consulting firms
 List of public listed software companies of India
 Software industry in Telangana
 Information technology in India
 List of Indian IT companies

References

External links

 
 

 
BSE SENSEX
NIFTY 50
Companies based in Mumbai
Technology companies established in 1968
Information technology consulting firms of India
International information technology consulting firms
MES software
Outsourcing companies
Software companies of India
Information technology companies of Bhubaneswar
Information technology companies of India
1968 establishments in Maharashtra
Consulting firms established in 1968
Software companies based in Mumbai
Companies listed on the National Stock Exchange of India
Companies listed on the Bombay Stock Exchange